Heaven & Earth is a computer game developed by Software Resources International and published by Buena Vista Software in 1992.

Plot
Heaven & Earth is an integrated triad of toy, puzzle, and game all based on a single fantasy legend. With the animated cards in a solitaire-like game, the player tries to score tricks of the highest value, working against a random draw. There are also a dozen options for puzzles to manipulate, from sliders and mazes to 3-D illusions. The "toy" aspect of the game involves picking off gems with a swinging pendulum.

Reception
Computer Gaming World stated "it's refreshing to come across a little gem like Heaven & Earth, which isn't quite like anything else out there". The magazine concluded that it "is a terrific game for people who like puzzles, especially visual ones". The game was reviewed in 1994 in Dragon #211 by Jay & Dee in the "Eye of the Monitor" column. Jay gave the game 4 out of 5 stars, while Dee gave the game 3½ stars.

Reviews
 Power Unlimited - November 1993

References

External links

Heaven & Earth at IGN
Heaven & Earth page from Ian Gilman (original programmer)
Review in Compute!

1992 video games
Classic Mac OS games
Digital card games
DOS games
FM Towns games
Puzzle video games
Video games developed in the United States
Video games scored by Richard Marriott